Ham-en-Artois is a commune in the Pas-de-Calais department in the Hauts-de-France region of France.

Geography
Two small streams flow through the commune: the Guarbecque and the Fauquethun.

Population

Places of interest
 The Benedictine abbey church of St.Saveur, dating from the twelfth century.

See also
Communes of the Pas-de-Calais department

References

Hamenartois